Kalleh Gah or Kallehgah or Kaleh Gah may refer to:
 Kalleh Gah, East Azerbaijan
 Kalleh Gah, Fars
 Kalleh Gah, Ilam
 Kalleh Gah, Kohgiluyeh and Boyer-Ahmad